The Cohutta 100 is an ultra-endurance 100 mile (162 km) mountain bike race held annually in late April.  The race starts and ends at the Ocoee Whitewater Center in Copperhill, Tennessee.  The course is one large loop through the Cohutta Wilderness area with approximately 35% single-track and 60% remote forest service roads, and a total of over 12,000 feet of elevation gain. One of the most challenging parts is the numerous small but very steep climbs.  

The race has been one of the stops of the National Ultra Endurance Series since 2006. Jeff Schalk holds the record for the best finish time, 6:23 in 2009. Carla Williams set the female record of 7:29 in 2016.

Results

See also
 Wilderness 101 Mountain Bicycle Race
 Mohican MTB 100
 Lumberjack 100
 Shenandoah 100
 Breckenridge 100

External links
 National Ultra Endurance MTB Series
 The Cohutta 100 Home Page

Cycle races in the United States
Mountain biking events in the United States
Endurance games
Recurring sporting events established in 2006
2006 establishments in Tennessee